The Senegalese Patriotic Rally/Jammi Rewmi (Rassemblement patriotique sénégalais) is a political party in Senegal. 
At the legislative elections of 3 June 2007, the party won 0.40% of the popular vote and none of the 150 seats.

References

Political parties in Senegal